Jose Vitor Leme (born August 15, 1996) is a Brazilian professional rodeo cowboy who specializes in bull riding. He is the 2020 and 2021 Professional Bull Riders (PBR) World Champion, as well as the 2022 PBR U.S. Team Series MVP. He holds the record on the bull Woopaa for the highest-scored ride in PBR history with 98.75 points.

Background 
Jose Vitor Leme was born in Ribas do Rio Pardo, Mato Grosso do Sul, on August 15, 1996. As early as 7 years old, Leme started riding calves. However, his parents separated and divested their bulls. Leme went to live with his mother, Sylvia. Thereafter, he became interested in soccer and played 11 years. He became a semi-professional player. He was also simultaneously learning Karate. But being a bull rider was still his desire. In Brazil, most often an invitation is required for elite events. He finally got an opportunity when he was 18 years old. It was in Rochedo,  near his mother Sylvia, who lived in Campo Grande. He pedaled 6 miles to the event and back to attend. His first ride, he got called for a slap.

That was the beginning of his bull riding career. He often had to walk or ride a bicycle to events. His father assisted him by buying some of his equipment. Leme improvised with equipment maintenance, traveling costs, and assorted other costs. Leme claims soccer has many moves that translate to bull riding. It was a hard road to get to the big tour.

Career 
Leme was a semi-professional soccer player before entering the professional bull riding circuit. At 21 years of age, Leme came to the United States for the first time to compete in the PBR’s Premier Series.

2017 season
This season, Leme competed on the PBR Brazil tour. That was his debut tour season. He earned an above average score of 82.61. In the finals, he made a qualified ride, took first place, and won $29,743.62. He won three events that season. This included the PBR Brazil National Finals at the well-known Barretos Rodeo in Barretos, São Paulo, on August 17. He was named the PBR Brazil Champion and PBR Brazil Rookie of the Year. This earned him a spot on the PBR Velocity Tour Finals in the United States. 

At the Velocity Tour Finals, he went 3 for 4. He placed 8th at the event, and won $1,800. He earned a spot in the PBR World Finals. This year, the World Finals took place at the T-Mobile Arena in Las Vegas, Nevada. Through a five day event, Leme rode six bulls in a row and won the World Finals event title, as well as the PBR Rookie of the Year title. This was a huge accomplishment for Leme, as he did not compete in any regular season events in the United States. At the World Finals, he won $416,000, of which $300,000 was the World Finals event champion bonus.

2018 season
In this season, Leme competed on the PBR tour with outs from November 2017 through November 2018. On November 9 through 10, 2017, Leme competed at the PBR’s inaugural Global Cup in Edmonton, Alberta, Canada, as a member of Team Brazil. He won $13,512.26 at the event. Though this event took place after the 2017 PBR World Finals and occurred during the 2017 calendar year, points won counted towards the 2018 PBR world standings. On December 16, 2017, at the Velocity Tour event in Kearney, Nebraska, he made a qualified ride, and earned $7,662.32 in winnings. On June 8 through 9, Leme again competed at the PBR Global Cup as a member of Team Brazil. The 2018 edition of the event took place in Sydney, New South Wales, Australia. He placed 10th in the event and won $46,772.03. On October 27, 2018 at the Velocity Tour event in Colorado Springs, Colorado, he earned $6,700 in winnings. He competed in the Velocity Tour Finals on October 31 and November 1, where he placed 8th and won $4,600. On November 7 through 11, he competed in the PBR World Finals, went 4 for 6, came in 2nd place, and earned $251,000 at the event.

2019 season
In this season, Leme competed on the PBR tour the entire year with outs from November 2018 through November 2019. He started his season on the Velocity Tour, in Corpus Christi, Texas. On the Unleash the Beast Series (UTB), in New York City, he won his first event of the 15/15 Bucking Battle. Then, in March, he won the UTB event in Duluth, Georgia. In Sioux Falls, South Dakota, he also won that event, which moved him into first place in the PBR world standings. He lost the No. 1 position briefly, but after winning a couple more regular season events, won it back. Those events were in Anaheim, California, and Springfield, Missouri.

Leme competed in the Velocity Tour Finals, and went 2 for 3 to win the Velocity Tour Finals event average and year-end tour championship. On November 6 through 10, he competed at the PBR World Finals. Jess Lockwood was unstoppable. He put up four 90-point rides, which pulled him past Leme, who finished second in the final world standings. Leme led the tour in regular season 90-point rides with 11, round wins of 18, and qualified rides of 47. He won $119,333.33 at the World Finals.

2020 season
In this season, Leme competed on the PBR’s UTB series the entire year, with outs from January through November.

On August 22, at the UTB event in Salt Lake City, Utah, Leme rode Chiseled for 94 points.

On September 10-12, at the UTB event in Billings, Montana, Leme rode all five out of his five bulls over the weekend. He won the 15/15 Bucking Battle as well by riding World Champion Bull Smooth Operator for 94.25 points. That was his eighth 90-point score of the season and the highest marked ride of the regular season. He got himself to number one for the event by riding Zero Time in round 3 for 89.75 points. He then rode Bad Decisions in the Championship Round for 89.75 points for the regular event win. Leme now had seven Premier Series wins this season. The record was eight, set by two-time PBR World Champion Justin McBride in 2007. This brought closer to another record; he had 15 rounds won this season, while J.B. Mauney held the record with 19 rounds in 2013. Leme earned $40,575 for the weekend. He has increased his lead over the number two spot held by Joao Ricardo Vieira.

On November 5-6, Leme competed at the Velocity Tour Finals in Sioux Falls, South Dakota, but unfortunately bucked off both his long round bulls.

PBR World Finals
In 2020, Leme won his first PBR world championship. In November, at the PBR World Finals at the AT&T Stadium in Arlington, Texas, he clinched the world championship by covering Woopaa for 95.75 points in Round 3. This also garnered him the Lane Frost/Brent Thurman Award for highest marked ride of the PBR World Finals that year. At that time, that ride tied for the third-highest scored ride at a PBR World Finals. He won $1,080,500 this year for that title.

Season summary 
He spent 17 out of 22 weeks as No. 1 in the PBR world standings, winning his first world championship. He also won 7 UTB events, 16 rounds, had 44 qualified rides out of 65 outs, nine 90-point rides,  a riding percentage of 67.69%, and $1.6 million in earnings.

2021 season 
In this season, Leme competed from January through November. A new record for highest scored ride in PBR history was set in the summer of 2021, when Jose Vitor Leme rode Woopaa (owned by Barker Bucking Bulls and Laramie Wilson of Hookin’ W Ranch) for 97.75 points in Tulsa, Oklahoma. He also competed in the Velocity Tour Finals again. He also became a two-time PBR World Champion. He won $1,871,257.92 including $1,401,800 in the World Finals this year.

PBR World Finals

Leme started out this season this year by breaking an ankle. A few events prior to the World Finals, he also managed to re-injure his groin and sustain a core muscle injury. These injuries caused him to miss nine events. And yet, numerous records were broken during this season. The World Finals returned to T-Mobile Arena in Las Vegas.  During round 1, Eli Vastbinder won this round with a 91-point ride on Manaba. Cooper Davis won second with 90.75 on Juju. Leme rode his first bull to place sixth.

Mexico's Alvaro Alvarez won a wildcard spot to the World Finals as a result of being the highest placing international invite at the conclusion of the Velocity Tour Finals. He won Round 2 by riding Detroit Lean for 92 points. Cody Teel was second in the round. He received a 91.75 pioint for riding Kid Knapper. Four others tied for fourth. Leme got his second ride of the week, finishing in ninth place.

In Round 3, number two rider Kaique Pacheco won with a 91.25 ride on First Down. Mason Taylor rode Walking Tall for 90.50 points and second place. Vastbinder was back again with 90 points to be fourth by riding Hell on the Red. He had just been injured earlier in that round. He rode that re-ride bull with those injuries. By this time, only Leme and Taylor had ridden all three of their bulls. Leme had ridden his third bull, finishing 14th.

In Round 4, Leme won the fourth round by riding WSM'S Jive Turkey for 92.50 points and increasing his lead for the world title. Following Leme was Mauricio Gulla Moreira. Marco Eguchi was third, and Vastbinder hung on for fifth. Again, it was just Leme and Taylor who had ridden all their bulls, going 4 for 4.

In Round 5, Vastbinder, who could barely walk or breathe, managed to ignore his injuries and ride Medicine Man for a 92.75 points for the round win. He made four 90-point rides in the World Finals. Leme rode his bull, Top Shelf for 91.25.

In the Championship Round, Leme rode Woopaa for 98.75, breaking the record for the highest scored ride in PBR history. Leme’s rider score was a perfect 50 points, another record. Woopaa's bull score was 48.75, just a quarter point shy of the highest bull score in PBR history.

By winning, Leme became the second back-to-back PBR World Champion. He also became the 7th rider to win multiple PBR world championships. He rode Woopaa to break the highest scored PBR ride twice. He had first broken the record in Tulsa, Oklahoma during the 15/15 Bucking Battle with 97.75. Leme won the world title by riding all six of his bulls at the World Finals. He, like J.B. Mauney, who did it in 2013, became one of two riders to win both the world title and World Finals event average by successfully riding all their bulls at the event. Leme successfully rode 49 bulls of 71 total outs this season. He tied the record with 2-time PBR World Champion Justin McBride for most Premier Series event wins in a single season with 8, and also broke the record for most 90-point rides in a single season set by 1999 PBR World Champion Cody Hart, who put together 16 during his championship season, while Leme put together 24. Leme was also now fifth in all-time money won by PBR riders with earnings over $5 million. Eli Vastbinder won Rookie of the Year. Woopaa won the World Champion Bull and Bull of the World Finals titles. The ABBI Classic World Champion Bull was Juju.

2022 season
This season, the PBR changed the format of all their U.S. tours. For the Premier Series from the 2022 season on, the tour will run from the winter into the spring with the PBR World Finals occurring in May at Dickies Arena in Fort Worth, Texas.

Unleash the Beast Series 
Leme's first UTB event of the season was in Duluth, Georgia, the fourth event of the season. Injuries sidelined him from participating in the first three events of the season. He bucked off Blue Duck in the first round in 3.92 seconds. For his next out two outs he bounced back. He rode Cold Chill for a ride score of 88.50 points in the second round. In the third round, he rode Mike's Motive for a score of 89.25 points. He placed third in the event.

In February, Leme competed at the UTB event in Milwaukee, Wisconsin. First, in Round 1, he bucked off Lonesome Fugitive in 4.26 seconds. His second bull, Tiger, he rode for 88 points. His third bull, Jag Metals Grand Theft, he rode for a high score of 92 points. At the UTB event in Oklahoma City, Oklahoma, Leme was back in form by riding Ridin Solo for 94.75 points in the 15/15 Bucking Battle. This was his seventh 15/15 Bucking Battle win. He bucked off his other two bulls during the regular event: Tulsa Time in 2.33 seconds and Falcon Eddie in 4.71 seconds.

At the UTB event in St. Louis, Missouri, Leme rode T-Bone for 86.75 points. Then, he rode WSM'S Trail of Tears for 88.25 points. Lastly, he got bucked off Big Black in the Championship Round in 4.17 seconds. Also in February, Leme competed at the UTB event in Little Rock, Arkansas. In the first round, he rode Heart & Soul for 68.50, but was offered a re-ride, which he accepted. He then rode Choc Tease for a ride score of 89.75. In the second round, He rode Hang ‘Em High for 90.25 points. Then, in the Championship Round, he rode Diddy Wa Diddy for 92 points.

In March, Leme competed at the UTB event in Glendale, Arizona. In round 1, he bucked off Yadi in 4.62 seconds. In Round 2, he rode The Good Stuff for 85.50 points. Also in March, at the UTB event in Kansas City, Missouri, he rode Dang, Dang for 89.50 points. But then he bucked off Magic Potion in 1.59 seconds and Vanilla Ice in 2.81 seconds.

In April, at the UTB event in Tulsa, Oklahoma, Leme delivered a 3 for 3 ride effort. The final ride was another 90-point ride. This after an injury had taken him out of competition for two events. In Round 1, his score of 89.75 on God Bless America was second best. Then, he rode Casper for 88.5 points to advance to the Championship Round in second position. Yet another time he neglected to pick Woopaa for the event win. Rather, he took on I'm Legit Too and won the event with a very high 94 point ride. This brought a check of $46,348.14 and moved him from 6th to 4th place in the PBR world standings.

PBR UTB World Finals 
In May, during the PBR World Finals at Dickies Arena in Fort Worth, Texas, Leme successfully rode four of his bulls. This included two 90-point rides, which were 90.25 points on Lone Survivor in Round 2 and 92.75 on Norse God in Round 5. The latter of which Leme won the round on. However, in Round 6, Leme was bucked off by Crossover in 6.24 seconds and the bull stomped on his chest. This caused four rib fractures on his right side and a partial collapse of his right lung. As a result of his injuries, Leme was unable to finish the event. However, when the World Finals concluded, he ended up finishing fifth overall in the event and won $92,500. Leme also finished fifth in the final 2022 PBR world standings.

Team Series 
The day after the conclusion of the 2022 PBR World Finals, the inaugural PBR Team Series season draft was held at Texas Live! in Arlington, Texas. Leme was selected to ride for the Austin Gamblers.

In mid-August, the Austin Gamblers clinched their first event title at the third stop of the 2022 PBR Team Series season in Anaheim, California, which was a "neutral site" event. The following week, the Austin Gamblers won their second consecutive Team Series event at Stampede Days in Nashville, Tennessee; the hometown event of rival team, the Nashville Stampede.

Leme won the inaugural PBR Team Series MVP award; being the best performing individual rider during the regular season.

Team Series Championship 
The Austin Gamblers were in first place coming into the PBR Team Series Championship at T-Mobile Arena in Las Vegas, Nevada. However, they were eliminated from the event after the second day. The Gamblers ended up finishing in fifth place at the conclusion of the inaugural PBR Team Series season.

2023 season

Unleash the Beast Series 
Leme missed the first five events of the 2023 Unleash the Beast Series season due to recovering from injuries sustained at the 2022 Team Series Championship. He made his return to the UTB series during the sixth event of the season in New York City on the first weekend of the 2023 calendar year. In Round 1, he rode Pickle Moonshine for 87.75 points. In Round 2, he rode Bad Decisions for 86.5 points. He was bucked off Choc Tease in Round 3, but rode Cliff Hanger for 92 points in the Championship Round to win the event. The following weekend at the UTB event in Chicago, Illinois, Leme rode Reinstate Hank for 83.5 points in Round 1. He then followed that up with a Round 2 winning ride on Knuckle Head for 87 points. In the Championship Round, he rematched with Cliff Hanger for 88.25 points and won his second consecutive UTB event. He had climbed to second in the world championship race.

During the tenth event of the UTB season in Sacramento, California, on the first weekend in February, Leme rode Havoc for 85.5 points in Round 1. He then rode Lil Hott for 89.5 points in Round 2 for the round win. In the Championship Round, Leme covered The Right Stuff for 87.5 points and won his third event of the season. He also climbed to first in the world championship race. At the following UTB event in Tulsa, Oklahoma, Leme rode Diamond in the Ruff for 88.75 in Round 1. He then rode The Show for 88.25 in Round 2. For the Championship Round, he matched up against I’m Legit Too; a bull he had faced five times previously and had successfully ridden the most recent four times they had matched up against each other. In this most recent rematch in Tulsa, the bull bucked him off in 5.97 seconds. Leme finished fifth in the event. The following weekend at the UTB event in Eugene, Oregon, Leme rode Chiseled, the 2020 and 2021 Professional Rodeo Cowboys Association (PRCA) Bull of the Year, for 88.25 points in Round 1. He then got bucked off by Punchy Pete in Round 2. His one score was enough to bring him back to the Championship Round. However, he decided to doctor out. Leme ended up finishing 12th in the event.

At the fifteenth stop of the UTB series in Milwaukee, Wisconsin, Leme covered Spirited World for 87.5 points in Round 1. He then rode Air Shift for 87 points in Round 2. In the Championship Round, Leme rematched with Woopaa. However, this rematch proved unsuccessful for Leme, as he was bucked off in 6.39 seconds. He ended up finishing third in the event. At the following UTB event in New Orleans, Louisiana, Leme rode Hog Wild for 72.5 points in Round 1. Because of the bull’s poor performance, Leme was offered a re-ride, but declined it. He then rode Bread Basket for 88.5 points in Round 2. In the Championship Round, he matched up with Fastfire and got bucked off in 4.57 seconds. He again ended up finishing in third place.

Awards 
 2017 PBR Brazil Rookie of the Year
 2017 PBR Brazil Champion
 2017-2020, 2022 PBR Global Cup Team Brazil member
 2017, 2020-2021 Lane Frost/Brent Thurman Award recipient
 2017 PBR World Rookie of the Year
 2017, 2021 PBR World Finals Event Champion
 2018-2019 PBR Global Cup Individual Rider Champion
 2019 PBR Velocity Tour Champion
 2019 PBR Velocity Tour Finals Champion
 2020-2022 Mason Lowe Award recipient
 2020 PBR Touring Pro Division Champion
 2020-2021 PBR World Champion
 2022 PBR U.S. Team Series MVP

Records
 Most rounds wins in a season (21)
 Most 90-point rides in a season (24)
 First perfect 50-point rider score in PBR history
 Highest-marked PBR ride of all time (98.75 points)
 Most Premier Series event wins in a season (tied with 8)

Personal 
Leme resides in Decatur, Texas, with his family.

References

Bibliography

Sources

External links 
 Jose Vitor Leme Profile on PBR
 Jose Vitor Leme Statistics on ProBullStats
Videos
 Jose Vitor Leme rides Smooth Operator for 92.5 points at the 2019 UTB Columbus 15/15 Bucking Battle in Columbus, OH
 Jose Vitor Leme rides Chiseled for 94 points in the Championship Round of the 2020 UTB PBR TicketSmarter Invitational in Salt Lake City, UT
 Jose Vitor Leme rides Woopaa for 95.75 to become the 2020 PBR World Champion
 Jose Vitor Leme rides Smooth Operator for 94.25 points to win the 15/15 Bucking Battle at the 2020 PBR UTB Ariat Invitational in Billings, MT
 Jose Vitor Leme and Woopaa with the highest marked score ever recorded in the PBR 97.75 points at the Tulsa, OK 15/15 Bucking Battle!
 Jose Vitor Leme and Woopaa 𝐑𝐄𝐖𝐑𝐈𝐓𝐄 𝐇𝐈𝐒𝐓𝐎𝐑𝐘 with the Highest PBR Marked Ride EVER
 Dalton Kasel + Woopaa = Historic Ride ‼️

Bull riders
Living people
1996 births
Brazilian sportspeople
People from Decatur, Texas